The Vermont Industrial School, which became the Weeks School, was a publicly-funded reform school located along Otter Creek in Vergennes, Vermont. Sold to the State of Vermont by the United States Department of War in 1873, the grounds and a couple of remaining buildings were part of the Champlain Arsenal which had been vacated by the United States Army in 1872. The industrial school moved to the Vergennes site in 1874 from Waterbury following a fire that engulfed their previous school. In 1937, the name was changed to the Weeks School to memorialize John E. Weeks, the 61st Governor of Vermont and former trustee of the school. The Weeks School was closed in 1979 due to nationwide deinstitutionalisation. The campus was soon leased to the United States Department of Labor and the Northlands Job Corps Academy opened, still occupying the buildings today. Two buildings of particular historic value are the stone Arsenal building and the brick Fairbanks building, both part of the Champlain Arsenal and were constructed in 1825.

References 

Schools in Addison County, Vermont
Defunct schools in Vermont
Educational institutions established in 1874
Educational institutions disestablished in 1979
Industrial schools
1874 establishments in Vermont
Job Corps